Anton Laar (13 June 1885 Võisiku Parish, Viljandi County – 23 February 1933 Tartu) was an Estonian politician. He was a member of Estonian Constituent Assembly. On 17 November 1919, he resigned his position and he was replaced by Hans Leesment.

References

1885 births
1933 deaths
Members of the Estonian Constituent Assembly